The open back unrounded vowel, or low back unrounded vowel, is a type of vowel sound, used in some spoken languages. Script a, which has its linear stroke on the bottom right, should not be confused with turned script a, which has its linear stroke on the top left and corresponds to a rounded version of this vowel, the open back rounded vowel.

The Hamont-Achel dialect of Limburgish has been reported to contrast long open front, central and back unrounded vowels. This is extremely unusual.

Features

Occurrence

See also 
 Index of phonetics articles
 Latin alpha

Notes

References

External links
 

Open vowels
Back vowels
Unrounded vowels